The trend of celebrities owning cannabis businesses is a recent phenomenon, sparked by the decriminalization of non-medical cannabis in the United States.

List of celebrities

Below is a partial listing of celebrities who own commercial cannabis farms or other cannabis-related brands or businesses.

See also

 Cannabis culture
 Decriminalization of non-medical cannabis in the United States

References

Lists of celebrities